Bogdan Dmitriyevich Zhbanov (born 28 April 1998) is a Russian football forward.

Club career
Born in Saint Petersburg, he made his debut in the Russian Professional Football League for FC Dynamo Saint Petersburg on 10 April 2016 in a game against FC Dnepr Smolensk.

In the winter-break of 2017–18 season, he joined on loan Serbian club FK Sloboda Užice.

References

External links
 Profile by Russian Professional Football League

1998 births
Living people
Footballers from Saint Petersburg
Association football forwards
Russian footballers
FC Dynamo Saint Petersburg players
FK Sloboda Užice players
Russian expatriate footballers
Serbian First League players
Expatriate footballers in Serbia